Defence Training Estates is an organisation within the United Kingdom Ministry of Defence. It is the operating division of the Defence Infrastructure Organisation, and is responsible for the management of the 78% of the defence estate allocated as Training Areas and Ranges. It provides sufficient and suitable estate to support the training requirements of the British Armed Forces, whilst ensuring environmental management and appropriate historical and archaeological preservation.

Structure and partners 
The organisation is headquartered at Waterloo Lines, Warminster' and has a number of regional headquarters responsible for the management of the training estate on a regional basis.

DTE works with nature conservation bodies to safeguard designated sites and protected species within the estate.  These bodies include the Joint Nature Conservation Committee, Natural England, Scottish Natural Heritage, the Countryside Council for Wales and the Northern Ireland Environment Agency.

Some practical support is outsourced to Landmarc Solutions, a joint venture between Interserve (a UK support services company) and PAE (an American multinational support services company owned by Lindsay Goldberg).

DTE currently runs five Air Weapons Ranges for military operational training: RAF Holbeach and RAF Donna Nook in Lincolnshire (England), RAF Pembrey in Carmarthenshire (Wales), the Tain Air Weapons Range in Rossshire and Cape Wrath in Sutherland (Scotland). A former air weapons range RAF Wainfleet in Lincolnshire was decommissioned in 2009. It had been in use since 1890 for artillery training by the 1st Lincolnshire Artillery Volunteers.

Public access
DTE operate a principle of presumption of public access to the training estate.  Access is limited where training and exercise activities are taking place or where the use of munitions precludes safe access.

Conservation and archaeology
As much of the training estate remains undeveloped, either through habitation or agriculture, the training estate holds considerable conservation and archaeological value.

Training Estates

Wales & West Midlands
Headquarters Defence Training Estate Wales & West Midlands, at The Barracks, Brecon
Defence Training Estate West Midlands, at The Barracks, Brecon
Swynnerton Training Area
Nesscliffe Training Area
Leek and Upper Hulme Training Area
Kinmel Park Training Area
Bramcote Mains Training Area
Sealand Rifle Ranges
Llansilin Rifle Ranges
Whittington Rifle Ranges
Tyddesley Wood Rifle Ranges
Pontrilas Army Training Area
Defence Training Estate Wales, at Sennybridge Training Area
Sennybridge Training Area
Caerwent Training Area
Pwllholm Training Camp
Rogiet Rifle Ranges
Defence Training Estate Pembrokeshire, at Castlemartin Training Area, Pembrokeshire
Castlemartin Training Area
Air Defence Range Manorbier
Penally Training Camp
Templeton Dry Training Area

North East
Headquarters, Defence Training Estate North East, at Wathgill Camp, Catterick Garrison
Whinny Hill Training Area (Catterick Garrison)
Ripon Training Area
Strensall Training Area
Driffield Training Area
Battle Hill Ranges
Defence Training Estate Otterburn, at Otterburn Training Area
Otterburn Training Area
Carshope Plantation
Quickening Cote Battle Shooting Area
Redesdale Rifle Ranges

East
Headquarters Defence Training Estate East, at West Tofts Camp, Thetford
Colchester Training Area
Stanford Training Area
Beckingham Training Area
Dukeries Training Area
Yardley Chase Training Area
Salthouse Heath Training Area
Kelling Heath Training Area
Watton Training Area
Barnham Training Area
Stradishall Training Area
Fulbeck Rifle Ranges
Thetford Rifle Ranges
Barton Road Rifle Ranges
Fingringhoe Rifle Ranges
Middlewick Rifle Ranges
RAF Donna Nook
RAF Holbeach

South East
Headquarters, Defence Training Estate South East, at Hythe, Kent
East Kent Dry Training Area
Mereworth Woods Training Area
Crowborough Training Camp / Pippingford Park Training Area
Hythe Rifle Range
Lydd Rifle Range
Defence Training Estate Home Counties, at 
Longmoor Training Area
Bordon Training Area
Barossa Training Area
Bramley Training Area
Barton Stacey Training Area
Browndown Military Area
Aldershot Training Area
Newtown Training Area
Otmoor Rifle Ranges
Pirbright Rifle Ranges
Ash Rifle Ranges
Chilcomb Range

North West
Headquarters Defence Training Estate North West, at Warcop Training Area
Warcop Training Area
Halton Training Camp
Holcombe Moor Training Area

South West
Headquarters, Defence Training Estate South West, at Wyvern Barracks, Exeter
Dartmoor Training Area
Braunton Burrows Training Area
Bodmin Moor Training Area
Langport Range & Dry Training Area
Tregantle Fort and Antony Training Area
Chickerell Camp & Wyke Regis Training Area
Yoxter Training Camp & Training Area
Penhale Training Area

Scotland 

 Defence Training Estate Scotland
 Headquarters Defence Training Estate Scotland, at Forthside Barracks, Stirling
 Barry Buddon Training Centre
 Castlelaw Training Area
 Tighnablair Training Area
 Garelochhead Training Area
 Inverness Training Centre, at Fort George
 Kirkcudbright Training Area
 Tain Cudbright Training Area
 Cape Wrath Training Centre
 Bunhill Range
 Black Dog Range
 Scotstown Moor Training Area
 Wick Training Area

See also
 List of British Army installations

References

External links 

 Official website of the Defence Infrastructure Organisation
 Guidance: The defence training estate – Ministry of Defence and DIO, updated 22 October 2019

Defence agencies of the United Kingdom
Training establishments of the British Army
Defence estate management agencies